Raymond Cruz (born September 10, 1964) is an American actor, best known for his starring role as Detective Julio Sanchez in the series The Closer and its spinoff Major Crimes, as well as his recurring role as drug lord Tuco Salamanca in the crime drama Breaking Bad and its prequel series Better Call Saul.

Early life
Cruz, who is of Mexican descent, grew up in East Los Angeles, California, in a neighborhood that regularly saw gang activity, and had relatives in such street gangs as Maravilla and Barrio South Gate. In an interview with The Daily Beast, Cruz stated he witnessed someone shot in front of him when he was 12 years old, noting that "his brains came out the back of his head." For his portrayal of Tuco Salamanca, he was able to relate to his experiences witnessing people who were high on meth.

Cruz has said that becoming interested in American literature early in life helped him avoid joining such gangs himself.  His favorite novel is Harper Lee's To Kill a Mockingbird. He attended East Los Angeles College.

Career

Cruz's film roles include sniper Ding Chavez in Clear and Present Danger, Hector in Out For Justice, Tom Berenger's second-in-command Joey Six in The Substitute, U.S. Marine Sergeant Rojas in The Rock, as Jesus in From Dusk Till Dawn 2: Texas Blood Money, USM Private Vincent DiStephano in Alien: Resurrection, and Ramirez in Under Siege. He appeared as Chuey, a gang member from the Vatos Locos, in the gang film Blood In Blood Out. In 2005, he played Chino in Havoc. He appeared in Gremlins 2: The New Batch, credited as "The Messenger," and in Training Day as a gang member named Sniper. He played a Los Angeles firefighter in Collateral Damage. He had guest roles in the Star Trek: Deep Space Nine episode "The Siege of AR-558", the X-Files episode "El Mundo Gira", and the second season of 24. He also made an appearance as the father of a murdered girl in CSI. He played a short-lived but well-known role as Tuco Salamanca, a sadistic and psychopathic meth dealer in Breaking Bad in 2008 and 2009, a role he reprised in the first two seasons of the Breaking Bad spin-off, Better Call Saul. He had a recurring role as Paco on My Name Is Earl, and as Alejandro Perez on Nip/Tuck.

Filmography

Film

Television

References

External links

1964 births
Male actors from Los Angeles
American male television actors
American male actors of Mexican descent
American male film actors
20th-century American male actors
21st-century American male actors
Hispanic and Latino American male actors
Living people